Roy Richard Scheider (November 10, 1932 – February 10, 2008) was an American actor and amateur boxer. Described by AllMovie as "one of the most unique and distinguished of all Hollywood actors", he gained fame for his leading and supporting roles in celebrated films from the 1970s through to the early to mid-1980s. He was nominated for two Academy Awards, a Golden Globe Award, and a BAFTA Award.

His best-known roles include Chief Martin Brody in Jaws (1975) and its sequel Jaws 2 (1978), NYPD Detective "Cloudy" Russo in The French Connection (1971); NYPD Detective "Buddy" in The Seven-Ups (1973); Doc Levy in Marathon Man (1976); choreographer and film director Joe Gideon in All That Jazz (1979); Officer Frank Murphy in Blue Thunder (1983); and Dr. Heywood R. Floyd in the 1984 film 2010, the sequel to 2001: A Space Odyssey. He was also known for playing Captain Nathan Bridger in the science-fiction television series seaQuest DSV (1993–1996).

Early life 
Scheider was born in Orange, New Jersey, the son of Anna (née Crosson) and auto mechanic Roy Bernhard Scheider. Scheider's mother was of Irish descent with an Irish Catholic background, while his father was a Protestant German American. As a child, Scheider was an athlete, participating in organized baseball and boxing competitions, for which he was classed as a welterweight, weighing in at 140 lb (63.5 kg). Scheider competed in the Diamond Gloves Boxing Tournament in Elizabeth, New Jersey. He attended Columbia High School in Maplewood, New Jersey, graduating in 1950, and was inducted into the school's hall of fame in 1985. He traded his boxing gloves for the stage, studying drama at both Rutgers University and Franklin and Marshall College, where he was a member of Phi Kappa Psi fraternity.

Amateur boxing
Between 1946 and 1949, Scheider boxed as an amateur in New Jersey. Scheider said in a television interview in the 1980s that he took up boxing to lose weight. He said he had no desire to fight, but that his trainer, Georgie Ward, encouraged him to compete. In his second bout, at the 1946 Diamond Gloves Tournament (Golden Gloves), Scheider suffered a broken nose and lost by technical knockout in two rounds to Myron Greenberg. He went on to post an 11–1 (six knockouts) record, reversing his defeat by Greenberg in the process.

Military service 
Scheider served three years in the United States Air Force as a first lieutenant in Air Operations from 1955 to 1958. He then became a reservist captain in the Air Force Reserve Command until 1964.

Acting career

Early career
Scheider's first film role was in the horror film The Curse of the Living Corpse (1964).

On television, he played running roles on two CBS soap operas, Love of Life and The Secret Storm, and also played character roles in episodes of Camera Three, N.Y.P.D., and Coronet Blue. He was in the TV movie Lamp at Midnight (1966).

In 1968, Scheider appeared with the New York Shakespeare Festival, and also won an Obie Award for Distinguished Performance in James Joyce’s play Stephen D.

He appeared in the films Stiletto (1969), Loving (1970), and Puzzle of a Downfall Child (1970), and on television in Where the Heart Is and Cannon.

Breakthrough
In 1971, he appeared in two highly popular films, Klute (1971), directed by Alan Pakula, and The French Connection (1971), directed by William Friedkin. The latter, in which he played a fictionalized version of New York City detective Sonny Grosso, gained him an Oscar nomination for Best Supporting Actor. Scheider became much in demand. He went to Europe to have key support roles in The French Conspiracy (1972) and The Outside Man (1972).

Stardom
Scheider's first starring role came in The Seven-Ups (1973), a quasifollow-up to The French Connection, in which Scheider's character is once again based on Grosso. He was second-billed in Sheila Levine Is Dead and Living in New York (1975).

Scheider portrayed Chief Martin Brody in the Hollywood blockbuster Jaws (1975), which also starred Robert Shaw and Richard Dreyfuss. Scheider's ad-libbed line, "You're gonna need a bigger boat," was voted 35th on the American Film Institute's list of best movie quotes. He appeared as secret agent Doc Levy in Marathon Man (1976), with Dustin Hoffman and Laurence Olivier.

Scheider reunited with French Connection director William Friedkin in Sorcerer (1977), a remake of the 1953 French film Le Salaire de la peur (The Wages of Fear). (Although it didn't do well at the box office, it has acquired a large cult following.)

He was originally cast in The Deer Hunter, the second movie of a three-movie deal with Universal Studios. Despite being under contract, though, Scheider dropped out two weeks before the start of filming. Universal offered him the option of reprising his role as Martin Brody for a Jaws sequel, and would consider his contractual obligations fulfilled if he accepted. Scheider accepted, and Jaws 2 was released in 1978. It was a huge hit.

Scheider starred in Last Embrace (1979), a thriller directed by Jonathan Demme.
In 1979, he received his second Academy Award nomination, this time as Best Actor in All That Jazz, in which he played a fictionalized version of the film's director and co-writer Bob Fosse. Some of the film's production was portrayed in the FX miniseries Fosse/Verdon, in which Scheider was played by Lin-Manuel Miranda.

He made a thriller with Meryl Streep for Robert Benton, Still of the Night (1982), which was a box-office disappointment. The following year, however, his box office performance improved with Blue Thunder (1983), a John Badham film about a prototype attack helicopter that provided security over the city of Los Angeles during the 1984 Summer Olympic Games.

He made two TV movies, Jacobo Timerman: Prisoner Without a Name, Cell Without a Number (1983) and Tiger Town (1984). This was followed by a role as Dr. Heywood Floyd in Peter Hyams' 2010, a 1984 sequel to Stanley Kubrick's 1968 science-fiction classic 2001: A Space Odyssey, in which William Sylvester originated the role of Floyd. He provided narration for Mishima: A Life in Four Chapters (1985).

Scheider was in The Men's Club (1986), 52 Pick-Up (1986) for John Frankenheimer, Cohen and Tate (1988), Listen to Me (1989), Night Game (1989), The Fourth War (1990) again for Frankenheimer, Somebody Has to Shoot the Picture (1990), and The Russia House (1990).

Later career
One of his later parts was that of Dr. Benway in the long-in-production 1991 film adaptation of William S. Burroughs' novel Naked Lunch. Scheider played a mob boss who meets a horrific fate in the Gary Oldman crime film Romeo Is Bleeding (1994) and a chief executive of a corrupt insurance company cross-examined by Matt Damon's character in 1997's John Grisham's The Rainmaker, directed by Francis Ford Coppola.

Among his later films, he appeared as the crusty father of hero Frank Castle in The Punisher (2004), and in 2007, starred in The Poet and If I Didn't Care. When Scheider died in February 2008, he had two movies upcoming: Dark Honeymoon, which had been completed, and the thriller Iron Cross. In Iron Cross, Scheider plays the leading role of Joseph, a holocaust survivor with a propensity for justice, which was inspired by director Joshua Newton's late father Bruno Newton. Iron Cross was ultimately released in 2011.

Scheider was lead star in the Steven Spielberg-produced television series seaQuest DSV as Captain Nathan Bridger. During the second season, Scheider voiced disdain for the direction in which the series was heading. His comments were highly publicized, and the media criticized him for panning his own show. NBC made additional casting and writing changes in the third season, and Scheider decided to leave the show. His contract, however, required that he make several guest appearances that season. 

Scheider hosted an episode of Saturday Night Live in the 10th (1984–1985) season and appeared on the Family Guy episode "Bill & Peter's Bogus Journey", voicing himself as the host of a toilet-training video, portions of which were censored on FOX and syndicated broadcasts. 

Scheider provided voiceover on the Family Guy episode "Three Kings" (which was recorded in September 2007 but aired in May 2009, a year and three months after his death in February 2008), which also featured his Jaws co-star Richard Dreyfuss. Scheider guest-starred in the Law & Order: Criminal Intent episode "Endgame" as serial killer Mark Ford Brady, who is identified at the episode's end as being the biological father Detective Goren (played by Vincent D'Onofrio).

Scheider narrated and was associate producer of the 2006 Jaws documentary The Shark is Still Working.

In 2007, Scheider received one of two annual Lifetime Achievement Awards at the SunDeis Film Festival in Waltham, Massachusetts.

After Scheider's death, a biography entitled Roy Scheider: A Life was released as a tribute, compiling reviews, essays, and narration on his life and career.

Personal life 
Scheider married Cynthia Bebout on November 8, 1962. The couple had one daughter, Maximillia (1963–2006), before divorcing in 1986. On February 11, 1989, he married actress Brenda Siemer, with whom he had a son, Christian Scheider, and adopted a daughter, Molly. They remained married until his death.

Death 
In 2004, Scheider was diagnosed with multiple myeloma. In June 2005, he  received a bone marrow transplant to treat the cancer. He died on February 10, 2008, in Little Rock, Arkansas, at the University of Arkansas Medical Sciences Hospital.

Filmography

Film

Television

Awards and nominations

References

Bibliography

External links

 
 
 
 
 Obituary in The Times
 William Friedkin on Roy Scheider

1932 births
2008 deaths
20th-century American male actors
21st-century American male actors
Male actors from New Jersey
American male film actors
American people of German descent
American people of Irish descent
American male television actors
Columbia High School (New Jersey) alumni
Deaths from cancer in Arkansas
Deaths from multiple myeloma
Deaths from staphylococcal infection
Franklin & Marshall College alumni
Infectious disease deaths in Arkansas
Obie Award recipients
People from Orange, New Jersey
Rutgers University alumni
United States Air Force officers
American male boxers
Military personnel from New Jersey